Mollaaliler is a village in the Ovacık District, Tunceli Province, Turkey. The village is populated by Kurds of the Aşuran and Kalan tribes and had a population of 30 in 2021.

The hamlets of Bektaş, Duvarcı and Gölbaşı are attached to the village.

References 

Kurdish settlements in Tunceli Province
Villages in Ovacık District